National Philanthropic Trust (NPT) is an American independent public charity that provides philanthropic expertise to donors, foundations and financial institutions. NPT ranks among the largest grantmaking institutions in the United States.

NPT specializes in offering donor-advised funds. They also offer charitable giving vehicles and platforms such as fiscal sponsorships, Type 1 supporting organizations, designated funds, and field-of-interest funds.

Organizational overview 

NPT was founded out of a family office in 1996 in Jenkintown, Pennsylvania. In 2000, they began partnering with financial institutions to provide donor-advised funds to institutional clients. Contributions from donors broke the $1 billion mark in 2005. In 2011, NPT began accepting contributions of illiquid assets like closely held stock, real estate, hedge fund interest, and more. NPT launched their first global affiliate in 2013.

In 2016, NPT launched "A History of Modern Philanthropy", a digital resource dedicated to charting the different forms philanthropy has taken over the past five hundred years. The site explores charitable giving through an interactive timeline that shows how philanthropy has evolved globally. It highlights two hundred key moments in the history of charitable giving.

Since its founding in 1996, NPT has raised nearly $13 billion in charitable contributions. It currently manages $7.4 billion in charitable assets. NPT has made more than 250,000 grants totaling nearly $6 billion to charities all over the world.

In 2018, NPT's donors recommended 40,690 grants in 32 countries across the globe totaling $1.01 billion (up 27% from 2017). 2018 was the first time that NPT's grantmaking exceeded $1 billion in a single year.

Philanthropic services 

NPT offers a broad suite of charitable vehicle offerings and philanthropic support services.

Donor-advised funds 
A donor-advised fund (DAF) is a giving vehicle administered by a public charity. Donor-advised funds allow donors to make charitable contributions and receive the maximum tax deduction available.

NPT's DAFs can accept a wide range of assets including cash, publicly traded securities, tangible personal property, closely held stock, and cryptocurrency.

NPT offers donors investment options in which they can allocate their DAF investments. NPT's impact investment offerings include six exchange-traded funds (ETFs) focused on generating positive environmental, social, and corporate governance (ESG) returns, in areas such as low carbon emissions and global education.

Donors can make international grants and other specialized grants through their NPT DAFs. A donor can set up a legacy plan by appointing joint advisors, naming charitable beneficiaries, or funding an endowment.

NPT also offers foundation-advised funds and corporate-advised funds to support collaborative funding projects championed by institutional donors.

Fiscal sponsorships 
A fiscal sponsorship is a collaborative relationship in which a charitable project partners with a public charity to receive tax-deductible donations and access to a network of support. NPT's fiscal sponsorship offering is designed to provide legal and fiduciary oversight and mitigate the risk involved in launching a new charitable project.

Supporting organizations 
Type 1 supporting organizations offer similar tax advantages to donor-advised funds. Supporting organizations are a popular choice for philanthropists who want more control over grantmaking and investments than a donor-advised fund, but less expense and administrative burden than a private foundation. NPT currently facilitates several supporting organizations, including the Saint Agatha Foundation.

Designated funds 
Designated funds are established to support specific charities. NPT offers designated funds for individual, corporate or foundation donors who wish to make a single charitable gift or recurring gifts to one specific charity.

Philanthropic Services Team 
NPT maintains an in-house philanthropic services team who can offer donors guidance for their philanthropic goals. This team may conduct research on geographic areas and specific issues in which donors are interested, or may assist donors with organizing site visits to grantee organizations. The Philanthropic Services team may partner with NPT's in-house legal team to establish grantmaking agreements so donors can stipulate naming rights or grantmaking provisions. For donor requests outside the scope of this team's expertise, the Philanthropic Services team may reach out to the Philanthropic Advisory Network, a national partner network of vetted philanthropic advisors trained to assist donors in conducting effective grantmaking.

International grantmaking

NPT 
For donors who wish to make grants to charities based abroad, NPT offers several options for international philanthropy. Donors may recommend grants to U.S. based charities with a global mission, or U.S.-based intermediary charities that fund overseas charities. Donors may also recommend grants directly to a charitable organization outside the United States through an NPT donor-advised fund. NPT assesses the tax-deductibility of these charities in its due diligence by using Equivalency Determination or Expenditure Responsibility.

NPT Transatlantic 
NPT Transatlantic is an international affiliate of NPT based in the UK that offers donor-advised funds and several other philanthropic services. NPT Transatlantic is a UK/US dual qualified charitable structure and offers dual US/UK taxpayers the ability to claim Gift Aid in the UK, claim UK tax relief and receive a US tax deduction. They also offer advanced grantmaking services, legacy gifts/bequests, and single gifts.

NPT UK 
NPT UK is an independent UK registered charity providing donor-advised funds and other philanthropic vehicles to donors who wish to base their grantmaking in the UK. NPT UK offers global grantmaking services to qualified charities outside the UK.

Donor-advised fund report 

NPT publishes the Donor-Advised Fund Report (DAF Report), an annual industry report consisting of comprehensive data on donor-advised funds in the United States. NPT began tracking data on donor-advised funds in 2007, using filings from all charities that complete the IRS 990. The report is an analysis of trends in the data. Key metrics include the number of individual donor-advised funds in the U.S., total dollars granted from them, total contributions to them and total charitable assets in them. As of 2018, NPT's annual DAF Report also includes a brief analysis of the types of assets being contributed to donor-advised funds. In addition, the DAF Report also includes data on the total amount of grants recommended by philanthropists from donor-advised funds each year.

The annual report includes projections in trends for the future.

Senior management 

Eileen R. Heisman, ACFRE, is the President and CEO of National Philanthropic Trust. Ms. Heisman received a B.S. with honors in Psychology from Carnegie Mellon University and a Master's of Social Work from the University of Michigan.

John Canady is CEO of National Philanthropic Trust UK. Canady previously served as the Executive Director of Philanthropy at Charities Aid Foundation in London, where he worked with individual, family, and corporate donors to structure their philanthropic activities through donor-advised funds. He was awarded the Philanthropy Advisor of the Year at the Spear's Wealth Management Awards in 2018. Canady has a B.S. from Wake Forest University, an International MBA from the University of South Carolina and a master's in public administration from Harvard Kennedy School. He is a dual US/UK citizen.

References

External links
NPT's Donor-Advised Fund Report 
A History of Modern Philanthropy

Philanthropic organizations based in the United States
Organizations established in 1996
Organizations based in Pennsylvania